Stella Chang (born 31 August 1966) is a Taiwanese singer who won the Golden Melody Award for Best Female Vocalist Mandarin twice.

Chang debuted in 1985, and released over thirty albums. She married Sung Hsueh-jen in 2005. The couple moved to Hong Kong, where they raised two sons.

References

1966 births
Living people
Taiwanese Mandopop singer-songwriters
20th-century Taiwanese women singers